is a Japanese video game developer founded on March 30, 1998 by Goichi Suda. They are well known for creating titles such as killer7 and the No More Heroes series.

History 
The company was founded on March 30, 1998 in Suginami, Japan. Its founder, Goichi Suda, gave two reasons why he chose the name "Grasshopper:" The first being a reference to the song of the same name by UK band Ride, which he was listening to on repeat when forming the company. The second reason is that originally he wanted to use a Japanese word "battamon" as the company name. "Batta" means "grasshopper" and "mon" is "a thing" and when you put the words together, it means "copy or fake." However, he later changed his mind and stuck to Grasshopper instead. The word "Manufacture" was added in because his game company was about "building things."

Headed by Suda, GhM were responsible for several original titles, ones that are also fraught with financial risk, but ultimately gained international mainstream attention in 2005 for the GameCube, Microsoft Windows and PlayStation 2 game killer7. Following releases included Michigan: Report from Hell (released in Japan, Europe), the Nintendo DS game Contact, the Wii game No More Heroes and its sequel No More Heroes 2: Desperate Struggle, and Shadows of the Damned. Potential losses were often made up by the development of games based on popular anime franchises, such as Samurai Champloo: Sidetracked, Blood+: One Night Kiss, and Rebuild of Evangelion: Sound Impact. In May 2007, Suda announced during a speech at the 2007 Game Developers Conference that Grasshopper was at the time working on three titles for the Wii, two of which were released: No More Heroes and Fatal Frame IV. There is no available information on the status of the third Wii game in development then.

Grasshopper was said to be working on an Xbox 360 title, and presented a concept for a PlayStation 3 game called Kurayami, a non-linear action adventure inspired by the worrying and confused universe of the Czech writer Franz Kafka, whom Suda admires. This was later cancelled and reincorporated ideas were put into the game Shadows of the Damned. In 2010, Yasuhiro Wada joined Grasshopper Manufacture as COO. He then left Grasshopper, and founded the company Toybox in 2011. During development of Shadows of the Damned, the employee count of Grasshopper would double to 140.

On 30 January 2013, Grasshopper Manufacture was acquired by GungHo Online Entertainment. Their first title released under GungHo was Let It Die. In 2018, the company would post a notice of an absorption-type split over issues in management, confirming that new Grasshopper Manufacture, Inc. would now operate independently of GungHo and work on their own intellectual property such as No More Heroes under Goichi Suda's management. The old Grasshopper Manufacture, Inc. (currently Supertrick Games) would retain a majority of Grasshopper staff at the time, which would be assigned to work on GungHo-owned IP such as Let It Die. Grasshopper Manufacture would subsequently downsize to a more indie scaled studio, hosting 20 employees as of 2019.

The company's first title developed after the split was Travis Strikes Again: No More Heroes, a spinoff entry in the No More Heroes series, marketed as a return for the franchise, a tribute to indie games and a commemorative title for Grasshopper Manufacture's history. The game was followed up with No More Heroes III, the first proper mainline installment for the franchise since 2010. The game retains the core development team from the previous title and was developed in collaboration with outsourced staff, being self-published by Grasshopper Manufacture, with physical distribution assistance from Nintendo. As a pair, the games mark Goichi Suda's return to a directorial role, having not directed a game since the original No More Heroes in 2007.

Grasshopper was acquired from GungHo by NetEase Games by October 2021. In announcing the acquisition, Grasshopper stated they have plans for at least three major games in the next ten years. In May 2022, it was revealed that Grasshopper opened a new studio named Yabukiri Studio, while they teased the announcement of a new game.

Games developed

References

External links 
 

2013 mergers and acquisitions
2021 mergers and acquisitions
GungHo Online Entertainment
NetEase
Japanese companies established in 1998
Software companies based in Tokyo
Suginami
Video game companies established in 1998
Video game companies of Japan
Video game development companies
Japanese subsidiaries of foreign companies